The 1810 State of the Union Address was given during the first term of President James Madison, the fourth president of the United States.  It was given on Wednesday, December 5, 1810 in Washington, D.C.  It was "concerning the commercial intercourse between the United States and Great Britain and France and their dependencies having invited in a new form a termination of their edicts against our neutral commerce."  It was addressed to the Senate and House of Representatives, it was given right before the War of 1812 began.  It was given to the 11th United States Congress, which contains both Houses.

References

State of the Union addresses
Presidency of James Madison
State of the Union Address
Works by James Madison
State of the Union Address
State of the Union Address
State of the Union Address
11th United States Congress
December 1810 events
State of the Union